Billy Sweezey (born February 6, 1996) is an American professional ice hockey defenseman currently playing for the Cleveland Monsters in the American Hockey League (AHL) as a prospect to the Columbus Blue Jackets of the National Hockey League (NHL).

Playing career 
Kesselring played high school hockey with Noble and Greenough School within the Independent School League of New England before spending the conclusion of the 2014–15 season with the Dubuque Fighting Saints of the United States Hockey League (USHL).

In his only full season in the USHL in 2015–16, Sweezey appeared with the Chicago Steel before committing to a collegiate career with Yale University of the ECAC.

As a stay-at-home physical defensive defenseman, Sweezey played a full four seasons within the Bulldogs from 2016 to 2020, completing his collegiate career having appeared in 127 games for 3 goals and 29 points.

As an undrafted free agent, Sweezey began his professional career in the 2020–21 season, having signed a one-year AHL contract with the Wilkes-Barre/Scranton Penguins, the primary affiliate to the Pittsburgh Penguins, on April 24, 2020. In the pandemic shortened seasonm, Sweezey in a third-pairing role made 22 appearances with the Penguins, collecting 4 assists.

In the following 2021–22 season, Sweezey continued in the AHL, securing a one-year contract with the Cleveland Monsters on July 12, 2021. Sweezey scored his first professional goal in his debut and season opening game for the Monsters, in a 4–0 victory over the Belleville Senators on October 22, 2021. Establishing himself within the Monsters blueline, Sweezey was later signed to his first NHL contract after agreeing to a two-year, two-way contract with affiliate, the Columbus Blue Jackets on March 7, 2022. With the Monsters unable to make the post-season, Sweezey notched new career highs with 4 goals and 11 points through 70 games.

Continuing to impress in his with the physical presence, Sweezey in his second recall to the Blue Jackets, made his NHL debut during a 3–2 shootout defeat to the Minnesota Wild on February 26, 2023. He was reassigned to the Monsters following his debut on February 28, 2023.

Personal
Sweezey's father, Ken Sweezey, enjoyed played collegiate hockey with Providence College in 1988–89. His mother Lorie Blair also played at Providence College.

Career statistics

References

External links
 

1996 births
Living people
American ice hockey defensemen
Chicago Steel players
Cleveland Monsters players
Columbus Blue Jackets players
Dubuque Fighting Saints players
Undrafted National Hockey League players
Wilkes-Barre/Scranton Penguins players
Yale Bulldogs men's ice hockey players